Ooni Ajimuda was the 14th Ooni of Ife, a paramount traditional ruler of Ile Ife, the ancestral home of the Yorubas. He succeeded Ooni Ekun and was succeeded by  
Ooni Gboonijio.

References

Oonis of Ife
Yoruba history